Beyond Salvation is the ninth studio album by the Australian hard rock band The Angels, produced and recorded in Memphis by Terry Manning. It was released in the US in November 1989 and in Australia in June 1990. The album peaked at No. 1 on the ARIA Albums Chart and it also peaked at number 3 on the Recorded Music NZ.

The US version of the album, released under the name The Angels From Angel City, featured a vastly different track listing. It was made up of 4 brand new songs, "Dogs Are Talking", "Rhythm Rude Girl", "Let the Night Roll On" (the only 3 songs to also appear on the Australian edition), and "Junk City" (Australian single B-side to "Let the Night Roll On"), and re-recordings of 5 classic Angels songs, "City Out of Control" (Night Attack, 1981), "Am I Ever Gonna See Your Face Again" (The Angels, 1977), "I Ain't the One" (Face to Face, 1978), "Who Rings The Bell" (The Angels' Greatest, 1980), and "Can't Shake It" (No Exit, 1979).

Track listing
Credits adapted from the original releases.

Australian release
"Let the Night Roll On" (Doc Neeson, Richard Brewster, Amanda Miller) – 4:04
"Back Street Pickup" (Bob Spencer, Brewster, Neeson, Terry Manning, James Morley) – 4:22
"Dogs Are Talking" (Brewster, Spencer, Neeson, Brent Eccles, Morley) – 3:23
"Rhythm Rude Girl" (Spencer, Brewster) – 5:36
"Jump Back Baby" (Brewster, Spencer, Neeson, Eccles) – 5:35
"Love Waits" (Brewster, Neeson, Spencer, Eccles, Jim Hilbun) – 4:25
"Bleeding with the Times"  (Brewster, Miller) – 5:36
"Pushing and Shoving" (Spencer, Brewster) – 4:35
"Bitch" (Brewster, Miller) – 2:23
"Beyond Salvation" (Brewster, Spencer, Neeson, Eccles) – 3:27
"Take an X" (Neeson, Brewster, Spencer, Micheal Towers) – 4:54

American version
An American version of the album was released in 1989 under the band name The Angels from Angel City.
"Dogs Are Talking" – 3:23
"Rhythm Rude Girl" – 5:58
"Let the Night Roll On"  – 4:58
"City Out of Control" – 5:35
"Junk City" – 6:23
"Am I Ever Gonna See Your Face Again" – 3:56
"I Ain't the One" – 2:24
"Who Rings the Bell" – 3:26
"Can't Shake It" – 4:52

Personnel
The Angels
Doc Neeson – lead vocals
Rick Brewster – lead guitar, rhythm guitar, bass guitar
Bob Spencer – lead guitar, rhythm guitar, bass guitar, backing vocals
James Morley – bass guitar, backing vocals
Brent Eccles – drums

Production
Terry Manning – producer, engineer, mixing
Bob Ludwig – mastering

Charts

Weekly charts

Year-end charts

Certifications

References

1989 albums
The Angels (Australian band) albums
Mushroom Records albums
Chrysalis Records albums